Limestone County School District is a school district in Limestone County, Alabama, United States. It has its headquarters in Athens.

Communities in the district include Ardmore, Elkmont, Lester, and Mooresville. Some parcels of Huntsville are in the Limestone district.

History

In 2011 the American Civil Liberties Union (ACLU) informed Barry Carroll, the superintendent, that a parent complained that Bibles had been distributed within the past three months on multiple occasions at one of the district's elementary schools. Carroll said that the allegations were "inaccurate or false."

Student discipline and faculty policies
The district has a zero tolerance policy towards fighting. The minimum punishment for a student is suspension from school.

As of 2005 the school district limits teacher usage of the internet. This occurred after the district discovered employees visiting non-educational websites and paying personal bills online. Meg McCaffrey of the School Library Journal said that the policy makes the job of a school librarian more difficult. Susan Kluger, a librarian at Cedar Hill Elementary School, said that the policy made it more difficult to teach students about internet websites that are safe to visit.

Schools
High schools
 Ardmore High School
 Clements High School
 East Limestone High School
 Elkmont High School
 Tanner High School
   West Limestone High School

Elementary schools
 Blue Springs Elementary School 
 Cedar Hill Elementary School 
 Creekside Elementary School
 Elkmont Elementary School 
 Johnson Elementary School
 Owens Elementary School
 Piney Chapel Elementary School
 Sugar Creek Elementary School
 Tanner Elementary School

Other
 Limestone County Career Technical Center

References

External links

 
"Limestone County, school district to split resource officer cost". WAAY-TV. Monday April 1, 2013.

Education in Limestone County, Alabama
School districts in Alabama
Huntsville, Alabama